HD 43691 b is a massive jovian planet located approximately 280 light-years away in the constellation of Auriga. Because the inclination is unknown, only the minimum mass is known. The planet orbits close to the star, closer than Mercury to the Sun.

References

 

Auriga (constellation)
Giant planets
Exoplanets discovered in 2007
Exoplanets detected by radial velocity

de:HD 43691 b